Carrigaloe railway station serves Carrigaloe on Great Island in County Cork.

It is a station on the Cork to Cobh commuter service. Passengers can travel to Glounthaune station to transfer to Midleton.

Description
The station is unstaffed and only the Cork-bound platform is accessible by wheelchairs. A footbridge accesses the Cobh-bound platform.

Cross River Ferries connects Carrigaloe to Passage West on the other side of the harbour. The crossing from Glenbrook (Passage West) to Carrigaloe takes 4 minutes and runs daily without the need of reservation.

History
The original station opened on 10 March 1862. Although the station closed to goods traffic in December 1974, it continues to serve passenger traffic.

See also
 List of railway stations in Ireland

References

External links
Irish Rail Carrigaloe Station Website

Iarnród Éireann stations in County Cork
Railway stations in County Cork
Railway stations opened in 1862
1862 establishments in Ireland
Railway stations in the Republic of Ireland opened in the 19th century